Suzanne Gerrior  (born 4 April 1973) is a Canadian soccer player who played as a midfielder for the Canada women's national soccer team. She was part of the team at the 1995 FIFA Women's World Cup.

References

External links
 
 

1973 births
Living people
Canadian women's soccer players
Canada women's international soccer players
Soccer people from Nova Scotia
1995 FIFA Women's World Cup players
Women's association football midfielders
NC State Wolfpack women's soccer players
Sportspeople from Halifax, Nova Scotia
Canadian expatriate women's soccer players
Canadian expatriate sportspeople in the United States
Expatriate women's soccer players in the United States
20th-century Canadian women